John Durant Ashmore (August 18, 1819 – December 5, 1871) was a slave owner, U.S. Representative from South Carolina, and a cousin of Robert T. Ashmore.

Early life and education 
Born in Greenville District, South Carolina, Ashmore attended the common schools. He studied law and was admitted to the bar but never practiced. He engaged in agricultural pursuits.

Political and business career 
Ashmore served as member of the South Carolina House of Representatives 1848–1853 and as Comptroller General of South Carolina 1853–1857. Ashmore was elected as a Democrat to the Thirty-sixth Congress and served from March 4, 1859, until his resignation on December 21, 1860 upon the attempted secession of South Carolina from the United States of America.

He served as chairman of the Committee on Mileage (Thirty-sixth Congress).

He ran a plantation, but his journals do not record how many slaves he owned.

Military career 
During the Civil War, Ashmore was elected colonel of the Fourth South Carolina Regiment, but resigned before the regiment was called into service.  After the Civil War, he sought a pardon for having aided in rebellion.

Death and legacy 
He died in Sardis, Mississippi, December 5, 1871. He was buried in Black Jack Cemetery, near Sardis, in Panola County, Mississippi.

Sources

 

1819 births
1871 deaths
Confederate States Army officers
Democratic Party members of the United States House of Representatives from South Carolina
19th-century American politicians
Ashmore